is a passenger railway station located in the city of Kami, Kōchi Prefecture, Japan. It is the main station of the city of Kami and is operated by JR Shikoku with the station number "D37".

Lines

Layout
The station consists of a side platform and an island platform serving 3 lines. The side platform connects to a station building which includes a waiting room, a Midori no Madoguchi ticket counter and a convenience store. An overhead footbridge is used to access the side platform. There is a siding north of the island platform.

Adjacent stations

History
At that time the station was operated by Japanese National Railways (JNR). With the privatization of JNR on 1 April 1987, control of the station passed to JR Shikoku.

Surrounding area
Kami City Hall 
Tosa Yamada Regional Joint Government Building

See also
 List of Railway Stations in Japan

References

External links

  

Railway stations in Kōchi Prefecture
Railway stations in Japan opened in 1925
Kami, Kōchi